Felicola is a genus of parasitic lice in the family Trichodectidae. There are at least 50 described species in Felicola.

Species
These 56 species belong to the genus Felicola:

 Felicola acuticeps (Neumann, L. G., 1902) c g
 Felicola acutirostris (Stobbe, 1913) c g
 Felicola africanus (Emerson & R. D. Price, 1966) c g
 Felicola americanus Emerson & R. D. Price, 1983 c g
 Felicola aspidorhynchus (Werneck, 1948) c g
 Felicola bedfordi Hopkins, G. H. E., 1942 c g
 Felicola bengalensis (Werneck, 1948) c g
 Felicola braziliensis Emerson & R. D. Price, 1983 c g
 Felicola caffra (Bedford, G. A. H., 1919) c g
 Felicola calogaleus (Bedford, G. A. H., 1928) c g
 Felicola congoensis (Emerson & R. D. Price, 1967) c g
 Felicola cooleyi (Bedford, G. A. H., 1929) c g
 Felicola cynictis (Bedford, G. A. H., 1928) c g
 Felicola decipiens Hopkins, G. H. E., 1941 c g
 Felicola fahrenholzi (Werneck, 1948) c g
 Felicola felis (Werneck, 1934) c g
 Felicola fennecus (Emerson & R. D. Price, 1981) c g
 Felicola genettae (Fresca, 1924) c g
 Felicola guinlei (Werneck, 1948) c g
 Felicola helogale Bedford, G. A. H., 1932 c g
 Felicola helogaloidis (Werneck, 1948) c g
 Felicola hercynianus Kéler, 1957 c g
 Felicola hopkinsi Bedford, G. A. H., 1936 c g
 Felicola inaequalis (Piaget, 1880) c g
 Felicola isidoroi Perez & Palma, 2001 c g
 Felicola juccii (Conci, 1942) c g
 Felicola laticeps (Werneck, 1942) c g
 Felicola lenicornis (Werneck, 1948) c g
 Felicola liberiae Emerson & R. D. Price, 1972 c g
 Felicola macrurus Werneck, 1948 c g
 Felicola malaysianus (Werneck, 1948) c g
 Felicola minimus Werneck, 1948 c g
 Felicola mjoebergi (Stobbe, 1913) c g
 Felicola mungos (Stobbe, 1913) c g
 Felicola neoafricanus (Emerson & R. D. Price, 1968) c g
 Felicola neofelis Emerson & R. D. Price, 1983 c g
 Felicola occidentalis (Emerson, 1980) c g
 Felicola oncae Timm & R. D. Price, 1994 c g
 Felicola paralaticeps (Werneck, 1948) c g
 Felicola philippinensis (Emerson, 1965) c g
 Felicola pygidialis Werneck, 1948 c g
 Felicola quadraticeps (Chapman, B. L., 1897) c g
 Felicola rahmi Emerson & Stojanovich, 1966 c g
 Felicola robertsi Hopkins, G. H. E., 1944 c g
 Felicola rohani Werneck, 1956 c g
 Felicola setosus Bedford, G. A. H., 1932 c g
 Felicola siamensis Emerson, 1964 c g
 Felicola similis Emerson & R. D. Price, 1983 c g
 Felicola spenceri Hopkins, G. H. E., 1960 c g
 Felicola subrostratus (Burmeister, 1838) c g b (cat biting louse)
 Felicola sudamericanus Emerson & R. D. Price, 1983 c g
 Felicola sumatrensis (Werneck, 1948) c g
 Felicola viverriculae (Stobbe, 1913) c g
 Felicola vulpis (Denny, 1842) c g
 Felicola wernecki Hopkins, G. H. E., 1941 c g
 Felicola zeylonicus Bedford, G. A. H., 1936 c g

Data sources: i = ITIS, c = Catalogue of Life, g = GBIF, b = Bugguide.net

References

Further reading

External links

 

Lice